Eneamiga (stylized onscreen as #Eneamiga) is a Venezuelan drama television series created by Karin Valecillos, and produced by RCTV Producciones or RCTV International. The series is directed by Juan Luis Fermín, Javier Vidal as creative director, and José Simón Escalona as executive producer. It premiered on 11 February 2019 in Latin America on IVC Networks, and it stars Diana Díaz, Leonardo Aldana, Charyl Chacón, and Damián Genovese.

Televen begain airing the series on January 12, 2021

Cast 
The cast and characters were obtained from the opening theme of the series.
 Diana Díaz as Paula Sánchez Mejía
 Naomi de Oliveira as Young Paula
 Leonardo Aldana as Diego Hernández
 Jhonny Rodríguez as Young Diego
 Charyl Chacón as María Alejandra Salcedo
 Katherine Gómez as Young María Alejandra
 Damián Genovese as Guillermo Castillo
 Carlos Piñango as Young Guillermo
 Raquel Yánez as Lucía Dávila
 Claudio de la Torre as Gianluca Brandini
 Andreina Chataing Mazzeo as Victoria Tellis
 Patricia Oliveros as Claudia Díaz
 Rolando Padilla as Domingo Sánchez
 Jorge Roig as Humberto Delgado
 Daniel Vásquez as Saúl Hernández
 María Antonieta Hidalgo as Gabriela Machado
 Theylor Plaza as Yostin
 Claudia Rojas as Yessika Vivas
 Raoul Gutiérrez as Arturo González
 Marcy Avila as Martín
 Michael Roa as Leonardo
 María Alejandra Machado as Sol
 Jhonny Jabbour as Fernando Silva

 Melany Mille as Layla Fitness
 Sofía Molina as Lisa Castillo Dávila

References

External links
 

Venezuelan drama television series
Spanish-language television shows
RCTV original programming